Luolong may refer to:

Luolong County, in Tibet
Luolong District, in Luoyang, Henan, China